The Convent of the Holy Family in New Orleans, Louisiana was the first convent in the United States for black women. It was co-founded by three women: Henriette DeLille, Juliette Gaudin, and Josephine Charles. The Convent would go on to operate a home for elderly or infirm women, a home for orphans and other charitable work.

Sisters at the convent renewed their vows every year for the first ten years, after which the vows became perpetual.

The Convent's first facility was an unassuming structure on Bayou street, but the Sisters soon moved to a new site, originally the ballroom attached to the Orleans Theater.

References

Notes

Convents in the United States
History of New Orleans
African-American Roman Catholicism